Ladislav Pajerchin (4 November 1944 – 2 February 2014) was a Slovak footballer. He competed in the men's tournament at the 1968 Summer Olympics.

References

External links
 

1944 births
2014 deaths
Slovak footballers
Czechoslovak footballers
Olympic footballers of Czechoslovakia
Footballers at the 1968 Summer Olympics
Association football midfielders
People from Rožňava District
Sportspeople from the Košice Region
MŠK Považská Bystrica (football) players